4007 Euryalos  is a larger Jupiter trojan from the Greek camp, approximately  in diameter. It was discovered on 19 September 1973, by Dutch astronomers Ingrid and Cornelis van Houten at Leiden, and Tom Gehrels at Palomar Observatory in California. The likely spherical Jovian asteroid is the principal body of the proposed Euryalos family and has a rotation period of 6.4 hours. It was named after the warrior Euryalus from Greek mythology.

Orbit and classification 

Euryalos is a dark Jovian asteroid in a 1:1 orbital resonance with Jupiter. It is located in the leading Greek camp at the Gas Giant's  Lagrangian point, 60° ahead on its orbit . It orbits the Sun at a distance of 4.9–5.5 AU once every 11 years and 9 months (4,301 days; semi-major axis of 5.18 AU). Its orbit has an eccentricity of 0.06 and an inclination of 11° with respect to the ecliptic. The body's observation arc begins with its official discovery observation at Palomar in September 1976.

Euryalos family 

Fernando Roig and Ricardo Gil-Hutton identified Euryalos as the principal body of a small Jovian asteroid family, using the hierarchical clustering method (HCM), which looks for groupings of neighboring asteroids based on the smallest distances between them in the proper orbital element space. According to the astronomers, the Euryalos family belongs to the larger Menelaus clan, an aggregation of Jupiter trojans which is composed of several families, similar to the Flora family in the inner asteroid belt.

However this family is not included in David Nesvorný HCM-analysis from 2014. Instead, Euryalos is listed as a non-family asteroid of the Jovian background population on the Asteroids Dynamic Site (AstDyS) which based on another analysis by Milani and Knežević.

Palomar–Leiden Trojan survey 

Despite being discovered during the second Palomar–Leiden Trojan survey in 1973, Euryalos has not received a provisional survey designation prefixed with "T-2". The survey was a fruitful collaboration between the Palomar and Leiden observatories during the 1960s and 1970s. Gehrels used Palomar's Samuel Oschin telescope (also known as the 48-inch Schmidt Telescope), and shipped the photographic plates to Ingrid and Cornelis van Houten at Leiden Observatory where astrometry was carried out. The trio are credited with the discovery of several thousand asteroids.

Naming 

This minor planet was named from Greek mythology after the warrior Euryalos, the leader of the Greek contingent from Argos during the Trojan War. The official naming citation was published by the Minor Planet Center on 11 March 1990.

Physical characteristics 

Euryalos is an assumed C-type asteroid, while the majority of larger Jupiter trojans are D-type asteroids.

Rotation period 

In August 1995, a rotational lightcurve of Euryalos was obtained from photometric observations over four nights by Italian astronomer Stefano Mottola using the Bochum 0.61-metre Telescope at ESO's La Silla Observatory in Chile. Lightcurve analysis gave a well-defined rotation period of  hours with a low brightness amplitude of 0.07 magnitude, indicative of a spherical rather than elongated shape.

Diameter and albedo 

According to the surveys carried out by the NEOWISE mission of NASA's Wide-field Infrared Survey Explorer and the Japanese Akari satellite, Euryalos measures 45.52 and 53.89 kilometers in diameter and its surface has an albedo of 0.065 and 0.061, respectively. The Collaborative Asteroid Lightcurve Link assumes a standard albedo for a carbonaceous asteroid of 0.057 and calculates a diameter of 48.48 kilometers based on an absolute magnitude of 10.3.

References

External links 
 Asteroid Lightcurve Database (LCDB), query form (info )
 Dictionary of Minor Planet Names, Google books
 Discovery Circumstances: Numbered Minor Planets (1)-(5000) – Minor Planet Center
 Asteroid 4007 Euryalos at the Small Bodies Data Ferret
 
 

004007
Discoveries by Cornelis Johannes van Houten
Discoveries by Ingrid van Houten-Groeneveld
Discoveries by Tom Gehrels
Named minor planets
19730919